The Package is a 2012 American action film directed by Jesse V. Johnson and starring Steve Austin and Dolph Lundgren. The film was shot in Abbotsford, Langley, and Vancouver, British Columbia, Canada, in twenty days from February 14 to March 5, 2012.

Plot
The film starts with Tommy Wicker (Steve Austin), arriving at a bowling alley and beating up a rival for not paying back Big Doug. Afterwards he visits Big Doug who tells him he wants a package delivered to "The German" (Dolph Lundgren), a dangerous crime lord. En route he is pursued by a rival gang who kills his partner and wants what he is carrying, forcing him to fight them off and run.

Eventually Tommy is captured by the rival gang and delivered to Anthony. He kills Anthony and most of the gang, manages to escape, is captured by the German and brought to see if he has compatible DNA with the German. He then breaks free and has a final showdown with the German, killing him. He then wishes Big Doug that the incident be filed away and they wish each other a hearty godspeed. Tommy then calls his wife Darla about the cash and tells her "I love you."

Cast

 Steve Austin as Tommy Wicker
 Dolph Lundgren as "The German"
 Eric Keenleyside as Big Doug
 Mike Dopud as Julio
 John Novak as Nicholas
 Kristen Kerr as Darla Wicker
 Darren Shahlavi as Devon
 Paul Wu as Dosan
 Lochlyn Munro as Eddie
 Mark Gibbon as Jake
 Peter Bryant as Ralph
 Monique Ganderton as Monique
 Michael Daingerfield as Anthony
 William B. Davis as Dr. Willhelm
 Jerry Trimble as Carl
 Patrick Sabongui as Luis

Reception

Box office
The Package debuted at number 81 at the box-office and made $1,469.

Critical response
The Los Angeles Times gave a favorable review of The Package, calling it an "uncomplicated guy's guy movie time, the screen version of the starchy passing pleasures of bar food." In contrast, DVD Verdict panned the film, calling it mediocre and saying that Austin's fight scenes were "unimaginatively produced and not much fun".

References

External links
 
 

2013 films
2013 action films
American action films
American films about revenge
Films shot in Vancouver
Films with screenplays by Derek Kolstad
2010s English-language films
Films directed by Jesse V. Johnson
2010s American films
English-language action films